Lyttelton Manor High School is a public English medium co-educational high school situated in the suburb of Lyttelton Manor in the town of Centurion in the  Gauteng province of South Africa. The high school was established in 1962.

History 

The school was formed in 1962.

Culture 

The Scottish heritage of the school is displayed through the uniform, with the girls' skirts inspired by the Anderson tartan, while the ties worn by the boys reflect members of the Scottish pipe band.

Sport 

The school offers many sports. The school competes in the small schools league for the majority of their sports; with the exception of soccer.

The sports offered include Athletics, Basketball, Cricket,  Cross-country, Hockey, Rugby, Soccer, fight club and netball.

Lyttelton Manor High also participates in the annual athletics event PEMHSAA, which is the Pretoria English Medium High School Athletics Association.

Controversies

In recent years, numerous controversies have belittled the school's reputation. In 2006 there was a stabbing at the school, and in 2012 a student was caught with a gun. In 2017 a student robbed a passer-by in the streets, and in 2019 a male student assaulted a female student.

Notable alumni
Desmond Barker, Major General in South African Air Force
Phumzile van Damme, Member of the National Assembly and Shadow Communications Minister
Kurt Darren, Singer, songwriter, and television presenter
Dale Stewart, Bass guitarist for the post-grunge and alternative metal band Seether

References

http://www.iol.co.za/news/crime-courts/fury-over-pupil-with-gun-at-school-1.1419732#.VDRI4RYQZco
http://rekordcenturion.co.za/20338/top-science-student-part-of-up-programme/
http://rekordcenturion.co.za/20143/matric-pupil-won-prize-for-best-afrikaans-speaker-at-public-speaking-festival/
https://www.jacarandafm.com/shows/workzone-with-barney-simon/kurt-darren-chats-barney-about-whether-or-not-his-marriage-hardship/

High schools in South Africa
Schools in Gauteng